The Harmony Sweepstakes A Cappella Festival is an annual showcase and competition for a cappella groups of all vocal styles. The competition is organized into seven regional events across the United States, with each winning group advancing to the National Finals in San Rafael, California.

About
Highlighting performances by hundreds of up and coming vocal groups from around the country, The Harmony Sweepstakes A Cappella Festival begins the season with regional competitions in seven major urban markets during the Spring months, followed by the gala National Finals to be held in San Rafael, California in early May. The cities of New York, Boston, Los Angeles, Washington DC, Portland/Seattle, San Francisco, and Chicago will each send a winning vocal group to perform in the National Finals for a sold-out house of enthusiastic a cappella fans and celebrity judges, in the hope that theirs will return as the Grand National Champion.

Called "the granddaddy of all the singing contests" for vocal harmony groups, The Harmony Sweepstakes embraces all styles of music performed a cappella, from the traditional forms of doo-wop and barbershop, gospel, and jazz to the exciting and innovative directions of contemporary vocal harmony. The festival "has helped to legitimize a cappella singing, once dismissed as a vocal novelty act associated with guys in straw hats singing barbershop harmonies." The essential musical instrument, the human voice, is being celebrated in many forms today—at the top of the charts and around the world—and The Harmony Sweepstakes is proud to be a part. The human voice and its endless possibilities have brought many diverse people together, and in a musical world increasingly dominated by technology, the appreciation of vocal music is a human connection that we can all share.

Festival history
The roots of the event began in a weekly sing-a-long that was held in the British pub The Mayflower in San Rafael, California. Everybody had such a fine time singing they formed the community chorus the Mayflower Chorus and held regular concerts and performances. As it is not always easy to find performance opportunities for a large chorus several members also formed smaller a cappella ensembles and began performing around the region.

In 1984, chorus member Lisa Collins had the idea to start a competition for the a cappella groups as a way to further develop an audience for vocal harmony singing. For the first few years the show was part on the annual In Performance at Forrest Meadows performing arts series at Dominican University and the Festival soon became a local audience favorite.

After a few years theatrical producer John Neal attended a concert and was thoroughly enthralled by the singing, the show and the concept of this first-of-its-kind music festival. John approached Lisa and offered to help develop the show and to expand to other cities and to make it a national event. They immediately became partners and other cities were added and the venue for the National Finals was moved to the much larger Marin Veteran's Auditorium.

Over the next few years the concerts grew in popularity and most every up and coming vocal harmony group across the land has performed in at least one show.  After a while groups from overseas also started to participate and to date there has been two Champions from overseas namely Vocaldente (Germany) and The Idea of North (Australia). The Festival is now firmly established as the leading showcase for vocal harmony groups and  has helped further the careers of many artists.

National Champions & Audience Favorites
Most of the groups that have earned the title of Harmony Sweepstakes National Champions have continued their careers to great success. After 30 plus years of competition the majority of national champions still continue to perform in some form or other. 1999 champions National Seven was signed with Sony Records and has toured internationally for years as the support act for Michael Buble. M-Pact was hailed by Billboard Magazine as the year's "Best Unsigned Artist." Hi Fidelity landed a gig performing frequently on the Carson Daly show, a direct result of their success in the contest. 2012 champs Six Appeal landed an agent after winning the event and now have a busy touring schedule throughout the country. The Knudsen Brothers (now known as SIX) have become a big hit in Branson, MO where they perform year round. 2009 champions Maxx Factor went on to become Sweet Adeline's International Queens of Harmony and, along with several of our other national champions such as Groove For Thought and Northshore A Cappella, appeared on the NBC show The Sing-Off.

National finalists

2014
Finalists:
 Catatonic, mid-Atlantic region
 SeaNote - Pacific Northwest
 3AM - Chicago region
 Women of the World - Boston region
 Prime Time - Bay Area region
 #FourB - Los Angeles region
 Quintessential Five - New York City region
Hosted by 2013 National Champions, Honey Whiskey Trio

2011
Finalists:
 Brass Farthing, Bay Area region
 The Brotherhood Singers, Chicago region
 Throat, Denver region
 Da Capo, Mid-Atlantic region
 Traces, New York City
 The Baudboys, Pacific Northwest
Hosted by 2010 National Champions, Plumbers of Rome.

2010
Finalists:
 Boyz Night Out, San Francisco
 Plumbers of Rome, Boston
 Home Free, Chicago
 Confidential, Denver
 Soundstage, Los Angeles
 West Side Five, New York
 bVocal, New York.

2009
Finalists:
 Love Notes
 Rezonate
 3 Men and a Melody
 Mouth Beats
 Evolution
 MAXX Factor
 Cartoon Johnny
 Road Show

2008
Finalists:
 Where's Gesualdo
 Syncopation
 5one
 Legacy
 Red No.5
 Vocaldente
 The Baudboys
 Sound Stage

2007
 Men in Black, Boston
 V-Chords, Pacific Northwest
 Moira Smiley & VOCO, Los Angeles (1st Place & Best Original Song, Stand in the River)
 Face, Denver (2nd Place, Audience Favorite & Best Original Arrangement, O Fortuna)
 The Fault Line, New York City
 Solstice, Bay Area (3rd Place)
 DoubleShot!, Mid-Atlantic
 Nightwatch, Chicago
Hosted by 2006 National Champions, Hi-Fidelity.

2006
Finalists:
 Clockwork, Bay Area (3rd Place & Best Original Arrangement, Donna Lee)
 Curious Gage, Denver
 ElmoTHUMM, Chicago
 Hi-Fidelity, Los Angeles (1st Place & Audience Favorite)
 Regency, Mid-Atlantic (2nd Place)
 'Round Midnight, New York
 Tongue Tied A Cappella, Pacific Northwest
 Traces, Boston (Best Original Song, Wonderful World)
Hosted by Groove for Thought, 2005 National Champions

References

External links
 
 A Cappella News 
 Primarily A Cappella

Festivals in the San Francisco Bay Area
Tourist attractions in Marin County, California
Classical music festivals in the United States
Music of the San Francisco Bay Area
Recurring events established in 1984
1984 establishments in the United States
San Rafael, California
Music festivals established in 1984